Louis Carlo Franceschetti (born March 28, 1958) is a Canadian former professional ice hockey player. He played in the National Hockey League with the Washington Capitals, Toronto Maple Leafs, and Buffalo Sabres between 1981 and 1991. He was selected in the 1978 NHL Amateur Draft by the Washington Capitals, Francheschetti also played for the Toronto Maple Leafs and Buffalo Sabres. Lou was a fan favorite in the late 1980s during his tenure as a Capital, mainly for his hard hits. He retired from active play in 1996, and is now working for a warehouse pallet racking construction company in Toronto, called Rax-Co.

He also played in the Canadian Minor Ball Hockey League, where he played with the York Canadians and finished with 85 goals, 66 assists, and a total of 151 points.

Career statistics

Regular season and playoffs

References

External links
 

1958 births
Living people
Baltimore Skipjacks players
Binghamton Whalers players
Buffalo Sabres players
Buffalo Stampede players
Canadian ice hockey right wingers
Canadian people of Italian descent
Detroit Falcons (CoHL) players
Hershey Bears players
London Wildcats players
Minnesota Moose players
Nashville Knights players
New Haven Nighthawks players
Niagara Falls Flyers players
Port Huron Flags players
Rochester Americans players
Saginaw Gears players
St. Catharines Black Hawks players
Ice hockey people from Toronto
Sunshine Hockey League players
Toronto Maple Leafs players
Toronto Planets players
Washington Capitals draft picks
Washington Capitals players